Dorcadion holtzi is a species of beetle in the family Cerambycidae. It was described by Pic in 1905. It is known from Turkey.

References

holtzi
Beetles described in 1905